Luther is a 1964 TV play broadcast by the Australian Broadcasting Corporation. It was adapted by Phillip Grenville Mann from the 1961 play by John Osborne. It was directed in Melbourne by Christopher Muir and starred Terry Norris in the title role.

Premise 
It is a biographical play about the life of Luther during the years of 1506–1530. The play shows his marriage and the interactions he had with the people in his life.

Cast
Terry Norris as Martin Luther
Syd Conabere as Knight		
Douglas Kelly	as Johann Tetzel	
Michael Duffield as Staupitz		
Brian James as Cajetan		
William Lloyd as Prior		
James Lynch as Hans		
Peter Aanensen as Lucas
George Whaley as Brother Weinand
Beverley Dunn as Katherine
Glen Farmer as Militz		
Michael Cole as Pope Leo X
Keith Lee as Eck
John Royle as Emperor
Ian Neill as Ulrich
Ray Angel as archbishop
Colin McEwan as one of the monks

Production
Osborne's play was first performed in 1961. The play had a cast of 34 and was headlined by Norris, who that year had already been seen in Nude with Violin, The Sponge Room and The Physicists. Colin McEwan, who played a monk, was a radio personality. It was designed by Paul Cleveland. It was the TV acting debut of singer Michael Cole.

Reception
The Age said it was "baffling". This review prompted a letter of response from Chris Muir.

The Sydney Morning Herald called it "quite painfully cramped and distorted... Norris made Luther hardly credible... the play seemed to take place in the vacuum"

The Canberra Times said "Christopher Muir's production, the best so far this
year, was among the most successful of all local productions, at least .since Ray Mcnnuir's departure. The first moments of the play, in particular, made spectacular television."

References

External links

Films about Martin Luther
1960s Australian television plays
Australian Broadcasting Corporation original programming
English-language television shows
Films based on works by John Osborne
1964 television plays
Films directed by Christopher Muir